Changoite is a rare zinc sulfate mineral with the formula Na2Zn(SO4)2·4H2O. Chagoite was discovered in the San Francisco Mine near Sierra Gorda, Antofagasta, Chile. The mineral is a zinc-analogue of blödite, cobaltoblödite, manganoblödite and nickelblödite - other representatives of the blödite group. In terms of chemistry changoite is somewhat similar to gordaite. The mineral's name comes from the early inhabitants of Chile - Changos.

Traces of magnesium and calcium in changoite are negligible.

Minerals associating with changoite are gypsum, zinc-bearing paratacamite, and thénardite.

References

Zinc minerals
Sulfate minerals
Sodium minerals
Monoclinic minerals
Minerals in space group 14
Minerals described in 1999